Pool A (Bath) of the 2019 Fed Cup Europe/Africa Zone Group I is one of four pools in the Europe/Africa zone of the 2019 Fed Cup. Four teams competed in a round robin competition, with the top team and the bottom team proceeding to their respective sections of the play-offs: the top team played for advancement to the World Group II Play-offs, while the bottom team faced potential relegation to Group II.

Standings

Round-robin

Great Britain vs. Slovenia

Hungary vs. Greece

Great Britain vs. Greece

Hungary vs. Slovenia

Great Britain vs. Hungary

Greece vs. Slovenia

References

External links 
 Fed Cup website

2019 Fed Cup Europe/Africa Zone
Fed Cup